, nicknamed , opened in Iwaki, Fukushima Prefecture, Japan in 1984.

See also

 Shiramizu Amidadō

References

External links
  Iwaki City Coal & Fossil Museum

Museums in Fukushima Prefecture
Iwaki, Fukushima
Natural history museums in Japan
Coal museums
Fossil museums
Museums established in 1984
1984 establishments in Japan